"Nöjd?" is a single by Swedish singer Veronica Maggio, from her debut studio album Vatten och bröd. It was released in Sweden as a digital download on 5 July 2006. The song peaked at number 6 on the Swedish Singles Chart. The song was written and produced by Stefan Gräslund.

Track listing
Digital download
 "Nöjd?" (Radio Version) - 3:02
 "Nöjd?" (Polyphonics Re-Shuffle) - 3:51
 "Nöjd?" (Spånka NKPG Remix) - 6:05
 "Dumpa mig" (Up Hygh's Blast From The Blast The Past Remix) - 4:03

Credits and personnel
Lead vocals – Veronica Maggio
Producers – Stefan Gräslund
Music/Lyrics – Stefan Gräslund
Label: Universal Music

Charts

Release history

References

2006 singles
Veronica Maggio songs
Swedish-language songs
2006 songs